Putt-Putt Travels Through Time is a 1997 video game and the fourth of seven adventure games in the Putt-Putt series of games developed and published by Humongous Entertainment. In 2014 Night Dive Studios re-released the iOS, Linux and Steam versions. In 2022, a port was released on the Nintendo Switch in January, as one of the first Humongous Entertainment games to be released on the system alongside Freddi Fish 3: The Case of the Stolen Conch Shell. Later in November, a PlayStation 4 version was released on the PlayStation Store. This is the last game to feature Jason Ellefson as the voice of Putt-Putt.

Production 

The production team brainstormed ideas for the follow-up title in the Putt Putt franchise. Among the alternate titles were: Putt-Putt Goes to the Carnival, Putt-Putt Saves the Universe, and Putt-Putt Learns to Fly. They eventually settled on Putt-Putt Travels Through Time. While the designs of the main characters were already established, the team had to work on designing to look of new characters such as Merlin the Medieval Sorcerer. The scripts was written and storyboards were created to layout how each scene would work as a self-contained piece, as well as part of a larger story. Background artists then interpreted both the script and storyboards to create the look and feel of the game through the backgrounds; part of their job was to leave sufficient space for clickable hotspots. Once the basic design sketch was approved, it was given more detail and finally painted. Next, animators created series of drawings based on the storyboards which when viewed together would simulate movement; each of the 30,000 drawings were then individually scanned into a computer, where they were cleaned up and had imperfections removed. The next stage was for artists to colour frames and animate clickpoints; Humongous noted that while this stage was "tedious", it allowed low-level artists to be creative and use their initiative. The work was handed over to programmers who wrote code to ensure the game responded to player choices, and who added sound effects to synch up to the animations. The music was created by Humongous, while voice actors were auditioned by the company (if new to the franchise), then sent to a studio to record their lines.

Putt Putt game designer Nick Mirkovich commented that there was a design philosophy of creating immersive interactive world for players to explore, and that like other games by Humongus, items needed for game completion were programmed to be in different places for separate playthroughs. Players could go behind the scenes into the game's production via the company website.

Plot
The game begins with Putt-Putt trying to wake up Pep while packing his history report and new school supplies (as well as a coin). He is excited to show his stuff for school to Mr. Firebird (who has turned his fireworks factory into a laboratory). When Pep is too sleepy to get up, Putt-Putt coaxes him with a dog treat and they head off. When Putt-Putt arrives at the lab, Mr. Firebird shows Putt-Putt a machine that shows eras from the past and the future, which is meant to be watched like a TV and not to be going in it. The machine needs a coin to start it up, so Putt-Putt (who took his school items out of his glove compartment) gives Firebird his coin to start it up. However, the Time Portal goes haywire and opens up, sucking Putt-Putt's items and Pep into the four different dimensions (Stone Age, Medieval, Old West, and the Distant Future). The portal can't be shut down until everything sucked in is brought back, so Putt-Putt goes into the portal to search for everything.

After finding every item (and Pep) in the time portal, Putt-Putt makes it out safe from the time machine (which appears to have grown even more out of control). Putt-Putt announces his success and Mr. Firebird shuts off the portal and locks it up tight, preventing any more disasters with it. Putt-Putt admits to Firebird that he didn't think of it as a disaster; he thought it was great fun. Before Putt-Putt can show Firebird his new school supplies, Firebird says that he'll have to hurry to school so he won't be late. Putt-Putt promises Mr. Firebird that he'll show his items to him after school before going. At school, Putt-Putt gives his teacher his history report and tells everyone about what he learned by time traveling as the credits roll.

Gameplay
The game mechanics are the same as the prequels including the glove box inventory, horn, radio and accelerator. There are also a number of optional minigames throughout the four eras.

Reception
Computer Shopper felt the game was fun, but ultimately failed to live up to predecessors of the genre. The Cincinnati Post deemed the game "outstanding", and recommended that younger children purchase an earlier title in the Putt Putt series first to acquaint themselves with computers before attempting this more "challenging" title. The Boston Herald gave the game a rating of 4.5 stars, praising the abundance of clickable hotspots in every scene which would keep kids entertained while completing the adventure. The newspaper also deemed the game one of the "finest kid titles ever". Rocky Mountain News gave it a B, commenting that it lived up to the quality standard of Humongus Entertainment. The Washington Times wrote that the game was "delightful" and "uncomplicated".

In the fourth quarter of 1997, the game was the 4th biggest seller in the PC Kids/Edutainment category.

References

External links
 
 Putt-Putt Travels Through Time at Humongous Entertainment

Putt Putt Travels Through Time
Adventure games
Android (operating system) games
Children's educational video games
Classic Mac OS games
Dinosaurs in video games
Humongous Entertainment games
Infogrames games
IOS games
Linux games
Nintendo Switch games
Point-and-click adventure games
ScummVM-supported games
Single-player video games
Video games about time travel
Video games developed in the United States
Video games scored by Jeremy Soule
Video games set in the future
Video games set in the Middle Ages
Western (genre) video games
Windows games
Tommo games
UFO Interactive Games games